The Movement is a 2012 studio album by American roots rock and worldbeat group Rusted Root, the album combines political and spiritual themes in its lyrics, along with a mix of pop music and the band's prior jam band sound. It has received positive reviews from critics.

Recording and release
The songs on this album reflected lead vocalist and songwriter Michael Glabicki's spiritual interests and a response to the Occupy movement. Glabicki initially composed tracks based around grooves and rhythms that he would scat along to until he composed lyrics and could finalize the track; The Movement is also his first time producing. The Movement was supported by a crowdfunding campaign that allowed some backers to come and perform on the album, singing backing vocals and hand clapping.

Reception
The editorial staff of AllMusic Guide scored this album 3.5 out of five stars, with reviewer Thom Jurek noting that the band has found a balance between their pop music tendencies along with their roots and jam band-based grooves, noting that this album is filled with "tight, hook-oriented, accessible numbers adorned in adventurous global percussion and musical modes". In Relix, Frady Khalil also noted that the band "have become good at embracing their musical past, even while moving ahead" with tracks that "giv[e] the album an overall sense of rooted, but forward trajectory".

Track listing
All songs written by Michael Glabicki, except where noted
"Monkey Pants" – 4:11
"Cover Me Up" – 4:26
"The Movement" – 4:14
"In Our Sun" (Liz Berlin and Jeff Berman) – 5:21
"Fossil Man" – 3:53
"Fortunate Freaks" – 4:32
"Sun and Magic" – 5:39
"Up and All Around" – 4:45
"Something's on My Mind" – 5:23
"Up And All Around" (Live) – 5:34

Personnel
Rusted Root
Liz Berlin – vocals, percussion, design, illustration
Michael Glabicki – lead vocals, acoustic and electric guitar, percussion, engineering, mixing, production
Colter Harper – baritone and electric guitar, percussion
Preach Freedom – drums, membranophone, percussion, vocals
Patrick Norman – bass guitar, vocals, percussion
Dirk Miller – banjo

Additional personnel
Jeff Berman – percussion
Vincent Cifello – hand claps
Quinn Glabicki – photography
David Glasser – mastering engineering
Paul Impellizeri – backing vocals
Dan Meuner – percussion
Phil Nicolo – mixing
Skip Sanders – clavinet, organ, shakers
Jen Staiman – hand claps
Vicki Staiman – hand claps
Lucy Stone – backing vocals

References

External links

Page from Shanachie Entertainment
Review from Grateful Web
Review from The Jamwich
Interview with Glabicki promoting the album and its tour

2012 albums
Rusted Root albums